The Dabos JD.24P D'Artagnan was a French light twin-engined civil utility aircraft of the 1960s.

Development

The aircraft was designed by Jean Dabos in 1962 and first flew in the following year. The D'Artagnan featured a two-spar plywood-covered wooden wing and an all-wood semi-monocoque fuselage. A retractable tailwheel undercarriage was fitted, but provision was made for changing to a tricycle undercarriage layout. Accommodation was provided for four persons.  The projected production version was to have a non-retractable faired undercarriage, variable-pitch propellers in place of the prototype's fixed pitch units, and 115 h.p. Potez engines.

Operational history

The sole example F-WJSV was flown extensively by its designer, Jean Dabos, for much of the 1960s. In May 1967 the D'Artagnan was flown to Biggin Hill Airport in Kent for demonstrations.
It was later registered F-PJSV in the homebuilt series and in 2006 was held in storage at the Musee Regional de l'Air at Angers Aerodrome.

Specifications

References

Notes

Bibliography

1960s French civil utility aircraft
Low-wing aircraft
Aircraft first flown in 1963
Twin piston-engined tractor aircraft